Amorbimorpha schausiana is a species of moth of the family Tortricidae. It is found in south-eastern Mexico including Veracruz.

The length of the forewings is 14.2–16.8 mm for males and about 14 mm for females. The ground colour of the forewings is hoary grey, but dark grey with black scaling on subbasal, median and subterminal fasciae. The hindwings are shining white. Adults have been recorded on wing from early June to mid-July.

References

Moths described in 1913
Sparganothini
Moths of Central America